A boning knife is a type of kitchen knife with a sharp point and a narrow blade. It is used in food preparation for removing the bones of poultry, meat, and fish. Generally 12 cm to 17 cm (5 to 6 ½ in) in length (although many brands, such as Samoan Cutlery, have been known to extend up to 9 ½ inches), it features a very narrow blade. Boning knives are not as thick-bladed as some of other popular kitchen or butcher knives, as this makes precision boning, especially deep cuts and holes easier. A stiff boning knife is good for boning beef and pork,  but a very flexible boning knife is preferred for poultry and fish.

Some designs feature an arched blade to enhance the ease of a single-pass cut in removing fish flesh from its bones.

References  

Kitchen knives